William Tijou (Australia) was a rugby league footballer in the New South Wales Rugby League (NSWRL) from the 1910s.

Tijou, a forward was graded at Souths in 1912. He also played with Eastern Suburbs in the (1917–20) seasons.

References

The Eastern Suburbs website

Australian rugby league players
Sydney Roosters players
1962 deaths
1890 births
Place of birth missing
South Sydney Rabbitohs players
Rugby league second-rows
Rugby league locks